The Garyville Refinery is the 3rd largest American oil refinery with a nameplate capacity of . The refinery is owned and operated by Marathon Petroleum Corporation. It is located in southeastern Louisiana between New Orleans and Baton Rouge on U.S. Route 61 in Garyville, Louisiana. The facility is the newest major grassroots refinery built in the United States, located on 3,500 acres of land adjacent to the Mississippi River. The refinery is on the former San Francisco Plantation property, which was designated a National Historic Landmark in 1974.

Construction began in 1973 by ECOL, Ltd. Construction was completed in 1976, and the refinery was purchased by Marathon Oil Company. Since then, the refinery has been expanded on multiple occasions, most recently with the $3.9 billion Garyville Major Expansion (GME) Project, completed in 2009.

Garyville Refinery operations consist of crude distillation, hydrocracking, catalytic cracking, hydrotreating, catalytic reforming, alkylation, sulfur recovery, and coking. The facility primarily processes heavy sour crude oils to produce gasoline, diesel, asphalt, propylene, isobutane, propane, fuel-grade coke, and sulfur. Feedstocks are supplied via pipeline, truck, barge, rail, and ocean tanker.

The refinery employs 900 employees and 600 contract workers.

See also
 List of oil refineries
 Marathon Petroleum Company
 San Francisco Plantation

References

Oil refineries in the United States
Energy infrastructure in Louisiana
Energy infrastructure completed in 1976
1976 establishments in Louisiana
Buildings and structures in St. John the Baptist Parish, Louisiana